Harold John Wilde Gilman (11 February 187612 February 1919) was a British painter of interiors, portraits and landscapes, and a founder-member of the Camden Town Group.

Early life and studies
Harold John Wilde Gilman was the second son and one of the seven children of Emily Purcell Gulliver (1850–1940) and John Gilman (1840–1917), curate of Rode. Though born in Rode, Somerset, Gilman spent his early years at Snargate Rectory, in the Romney Marshes in Kent, where his father was the Rector. He was educated in Kent, Abingdon School in Berkshire, from 1885 to 1890, in Rochester and at Tonbridge School, and for one year at Brasenose College in Oxford University.

Although he developed an interest in art during a childhood convalescence period, Gilman did not begin his artistic training until after his non-collegiate year at Oxford University (cut short by ill health) and after working in the Ukraine as a tutor to a British family in Odessa (1895).  In 1896 he entered the Hastings School of Art to study painting, but in 1897 transferred to the Slade School of Fine Art in London, where he remained from 1897 to 1901, and where he met Spencer Gore. In 1902 he went to Spain and spent over a year studying Spanish masters. Velázquez and Goya as well as Whistler were major early influences.

Marriages
At this time he met the American painter Grace Cornelia Canedy (1869–1965), they had both been copying Velázquez in the Museo del Prado in Madrid. They married on 7 February 1903 in the garden of the United States consulate in Toledo, Spain. The couple settled in London (apart from a visit to her family in Chicago, when Gilman ducked pressure to join the Canedy family business). They had five children, of whom three survived, Elizabeth (born in London 19 January 1904), Hannah (born 4 February 1905 in Chicago), and David Canedy (born on 20 September 1908, at Letchworth Garden City in Hertfordshire). The family address at this time was 15 Westholm Green, Letchworth. Grace Gilman left him in 1909, taking her three children to Chicago. The couple were later divorced.

Harold Gilman was married, for the second time, to (Dorothy) Sylvia Hardy formerly Meyer (1892–1971), an artist he had met at Westminster and who had studied with him since 1914. She had their child in December 1917 and they married on 20 April 1918, on learning that Gilman's divorce had been finalised. After Gilman's death, in 1921 Sylvia married Leofric Gilman, his brother.

Painting career
Meeting Walter Sickert in 1907, Gilman became a founder member of both the Fitzroy Street Group (in 1907) and the Camden Town Group (in 1911).  In the meantime he joined the Allied Artists' Association, moved to Letchworth, and began to show influence from work of Vuillard as well as Sickert.

In 1910 he was stimulated by the first post-Impressionist exhibition at the Grafton Galleries, and visited Paris with Ginner. He soon outpaced Sickert's understanding of post-Impressionism and moved out from under his shadow, using ever stronger colour, under the influence of Van Gogh, Gauguin and Signac. In 1913 he exhibited jointly with Gore, and became the first president of the London Group, and identified with Charles Ginner as a 'Neo-Realist', exhibiting with Ginner under that label in 1914.

Gilman visited Scandinavia in 1912 and 1913, and may have travelled with the artist William Ratcliffe, who had relations there. Gilman made studies of the environment, and painted Canal Bridge, Flekkefjord, an accurate depiction, whose subject is likely to have been inspired by Van Gogh's depiction of a similar bridge in Provence. Gilman had rejected Van Gogh's work when he first encountered it, but later became a strong admirer. According to Wyndham Lewis, he kept postcards of Van Gogh's work on his wall and sometimes hung one of his own works next to them, if he was especially satisfied with it.

In 1914 he joined Robert Bevan's short-lived Cumberland Market Group, with Charles Ginner and (later) John Nash. In 1915 the group held their only exhibition.

He taught at the Westminster School of Art where he influenced students who included Mary Godwin, Ruth Doggett, and Marjorie Sherlock. He then started his own school with Ginner.

In 1918 he was commissioned to travel to Nova Scotia by the Canadian War Records; and painted a picture of Halifax Harbour for the War Memorial at Ottawa.

He died in London on 12 February 1919, of the Spanish flu.

Legacy 
Exhibitions were devoted to him at the Tate in 1954 and 1981, and he also featured in its 2007–2008 Camden Town Group retrospective at Tate Britain.

See also
 List of Old Abingdonians

Gallery

Notes and references

Bibliography
 Helena Bonett, 'Harold Gilman 1876–1919', artist biography, October 2009, in Helena Bonett, Ysanne Holt, Jennifer Mundy (eds.), The Camden Town Group in Context, Tate, May 2012, http://www.tate.org.uk/art/research-publications/camden-town-group/harold-gilman-r1105360
 Robert Upstone, Modern Painters: The Camden Town Group, exhibition catalogue, Tate Britain, London, 2008 
 Harold Gilman and William Ratcliffe, Southampton City Art Gallery, 2002

External links

Harold Gilman paintings at Tate Britain
Harold Gilman at Grove Art Online
Harold Gilman in the Dictionary of National Biography

1876 births
1919 deaths
Deaths from the Spanish flu pandemic in England
19th-century English painters
English male painters
20th-century English painters
People from Mendip District
People educated at Abingdon School
Alumni of the Slade School of Fine Art
Alumni of Brasenose College, Oxford
20th-century English male artists
19th-century English male artists